= Adamu Attahiru Abdulkadir =

Nigerian politician

Senator of the National Assembly of Nigeria
- In office 2023–2023
- Constituency: Kwara North

Personal details
- Born: 1977 (age 48–49) Nigeria
- Party: Social Democratic Party
- Occupation: Politician

Adamu Attahiru Abdulkadir, born in 1977, is a Nigerian politician who represented Kwara North in the National Assembly as a senator in 2023, serving under the Social Democratic Party (SDP) from Kwara State.
